Chauliodus danae, or dana viperfish, is a species of viperfish in the family Stomiidae. The Dana Viperfish is mostly found in the bathyal zone. The species was first caught and recognised on the Dana expeditions 1920-1922 and named after the research vessel Dana.

References

 
 

Chauliodus
Fish described in 1929